is a Japanese television drama series that first aired on TBS in 1981.

Cast
 Masako Mori
 Yūko Kotegawa
 Yūko Tanaka
 Kyōhei Shibata
 Takehiko Maeda

References

1981 Japanese television series debuts
1981 Japanese television series endings
Japanese drama television series
TBS Television (Japan) dramas